Derbyshire is a county in the East Midlands of England. The ceremonial county of Derbyshire includes the unitary authority of the city of Derby.   This is a complete list of the Grade I listed churches and chapels in the ceremonial county as recorded in the National Heritage List for England.  Buildings are listed by the Secretary of State for Culture, Media and Sport on the recommendation of Historic England.  Grade I listed buildings are defined as being of "exceptional interest, sometimes considered to be internationally important"; only 2.5 per cent of listed buildings are included in this grade.

Christian churches have existed in Derbyshire since the Anglo-Saxon era, and some of the Grade I listed churches have retained Saxon features.  St. Wystan's Church, Repton, has a complete Anglo-Saxon crypt, and some churches have fragments of Anglo-Saxon stones incorporated in their structure, including All Saints' Church, Aston-upon-Trent, and All Saints, Bakewell.  More churches contain elements of Norman architecture.  The architectural historian Nikolaus Pevsner identified the two most important Norman churches as St Michael with St Mary's Church, Melbourne, and All Saints' Church, Steetley, the latter being little more than a chapel.  Most of the churches in the list date from the 15th century or before, and the predominant architectural style in the list is Gothic.  Only three churches in the list originate after 1600, namely St Saviour's Church, Foremark, built in 1662, St Mary's Church, Cromford, the building of which started in 1792, and Church of All Saints, Hassop, built in 1816–17, and the only Neoclassical church in the list.

Derbyshire is a largely rural county, and contains much of the Peak District National Park.  Past industries have included coal-mining, and quarrying of stone continues in the county.  Industry is located mainly in and around Derby.  The bedrock of much of the county is carboniferous limestone, with areas of sandstone and millstone Grit, these stones providing the major building materials for the churches.

Churches

References
Citations

Sources

 
Derbyshire
 
Lists of Grade I listed buildings in Derbyshire